The Houston mayoral election of 1999 took place on November 2, 1999. Incumbent Mayor Lee Brown was re-elected to a second term. The election was officially non-partisan.

Candidates

Incumbent Mayor Lee Brown
Jack Terence
Outlaw Josey Wales IV

Results

See also

Elections in Texas

1999 in Houston
Houston mayoral
Houston
1999
Non-partisan elections